Iberochondrostoma almacai is a species of cyprinid fish endemic to southern Portugal, where it is only found in the drainages of the Mira, Arade and Bensafrim rivers. It shelters in pools when the rivers shrink in the summer and is threatened by habitat destruction caused by water abstraction and predation and competition from introduced species of fish such as Gambusia, Micropterus and Lepomis.

References 

 

Iberochondrostoma
Endemic fauna of Portugal
Endemic fish of the Iberian Peninsula
Fish described in 2005